Yelli is a village in the District of Güdül, Ankara Province, Turkey.

References

Villages in Güdül District